Anish Luitel (born 1 April 1994) is a mountaineer and the first Boy Scout from Nepal to climb Mount Everest from both the North and South Side. Anish is known for his mountain climbing and as a motivational speaker. 

After climbing Everest and completing each requirement, Luitel was endowed with the Gold Duke of Edinburgh Award. He was also awarded with Gallantry Award and Praise worthy Behavior Medal by Nepal Scouts, National Headquarters.

Everest summits
Luitel made his first attempt to climb Mount Everest in 2015, which failed due to the massive avalanche caused by the April 2015 Nepal earthquake. Two of his teammates were killed in the avalanche.

In 2016, May 21, at the age of 22, Luitel summited Mount Everest from the south side becoming the first scout from  Nepal to summit Mount Everest. In this successful attempt, he brought the flag of the Northern Star Council of the Boy Scouts of America along with him. Anish also summited with the 100-year Anniversary flag of Boy Scout of America which is displayed on Northern Star Council.

In 2018, May 14, he climbed solo from the north side carrying the flag of the 2019 World Scout Jamboree, marking the first time the flag had been flown on Mount Everest in the history of Scouting.

In 2018 Anish became 543rd and first Boy Scout to summit Everest from both North and south side.

Awards
 Gold Award holder of The Duke of Edinburgh's International Award
Gallantry Award from  Nepal Scout
Praise Worthy Behavior Medal from Nepal Scout

References

External links

1994 births
Living people
People associated with Scouting
Scouting in Nepal
Nepalese summiters of Mount Everest
People from Jhapa District